In mathematics, an antimatroid is a formal system that describes processes in which a set is built up by including elements one at a time, and in which an element, once available for inclusion, remains available until it is included. Antimatroids are commonly axiomatized in two equivalent ways, either as a set system modeling the possible states of such a process, or as a formal language modeling the different sequences in which elements may be included.
Dilworth (1940) was the first to study antimatroids, using yet another axiomatization based on lattice theory, and they have been frequently rediscovered in other contexts.

The axioms defining antimatroids as set systems are very similar to those of matroids, but whereas matroids are defined by an exchange axiom, antimatroids are defined instead by an anti-exchange axiom, from which their name derives.
Antimatroids can be viewed as a special case of greedoids and of semimodular lattices, and as a generalization of partial orders and of distributive lattices. 
Antimatroids are equivalent, by complementation, to convex geometries, a combinatorial abstraction of convex sets in geometry.

Antimatroids have been applied to model precedence constraints in scheduling problems, potential event sequences in simulations, task planning in artificial intelligence, and the states of knowledge of human learners.

Definitions 
An antimatroid can be defined as a finite family  of finite sets, called feasible sets, with the following two properties:
 The union of any two feasible sets is also feasible. That is,  is closed under unions.
That is,  is an accessible set system.

Antimatroids also have an equivalent definition as a formal language, that is, as a set of strings defined from a finite alphabet of symbols. A string that belongs to this set is called a word of the language. A language  defining an antimatroid must satisfy the following properties:
 Each word of  contains at most one copy of each symbol. A language with this property is called normal.
A language with this property is called hereditary.

The equivalence of these two forms of definition can be seen as follows. If  is an antimatroid defined as a formal language, then the sets of symbols in words of  form an accessible union-closed set system. It is accessible by the hereditary property of strings, and it can be shown to be union-closed by repeated application of the concatenation property of strings. In the other direction, from an accessible union-closed set system  , the language of normal strings whose prefixes all have sets of symbols belonging to  meets the requirements for a formal language to be an antimatroid. These two transformations are the inverses of each other: transforming a formal language into a set family and back, or vice versa, produces the same system. Thus, these two definitions lead to mathematically equivalent classes of objects.

Examples

The following systems provide examples of antimatroids:

Chain antimatroids
The prefixes of a single string, and the sets of symbols in these prefixes, form an antimatroid. For instance the chain antimatroid defined by the string  has as its formal language the set of strings  (where  denotes the empty string) and as its family of feasible sets the family 
Poset antimatroids
The lower sets of a finite partially ordered set form an antimatroid, with the full-length words of the antimatroid forming the linear extensions of the partial order. By Birkhoff's representation theorem for distributive lattices, the feasible sets in a poset antimatroid (ordered by set inclusion) form a distributive lattice, and all distributive lattices can be formed in this way. Thus, antimatroids can be seen as generalizations of distributive lattices. A chain antimatroid is the special case of a poset antimatroid for a total order.
Shelling antimatroids
A shelling sequence of a finite set  of points in the Euclidean plane or a higher-dimensional Euclidean space is formed by repeatedly removing vertices of the convex hull. Every antimatroid is isomorphic to a shelling antimatroid of points in a sufficiently high-dimensional space.
Perfect elimination
The prefixes of perfect elimination orderings of a chordal graph form an antimatroid.
Chip-firing games
Chip-firing games such as the abelian sandpile model are defined by a directed graph together with a system of "chips" placed on its vertices. The event that  fires for the th time can only happen if it has already fired  times and accumulated  total chips. These conditions do not depend on the ordering of previous firings, and remain true until  fires, so any given graph and initial placement of chips for which the system terminates defines an antimatroid on the pairs . A consequence of the antimatroid property of these systems is that, for a given initial state, the number of times each vertex fires and the eventual stable state of the system do not depend on the firing order.

Paths and basic words
In the set theoretic axiomatization of an antimatroid there are certain special sets called paths that determine the whole antimatroid, in the sense that the sets of the antimatroid are exactly the unions of paths. The family of paths can be partially ordered by set inclusion, forming the path poset of the antimatroid.

Therefore, each feasible set in an antimatroid is the union of its path subsets. But, if  is itself a path with endpoint , each proper subset of  that belongs to the antimatroid excludes . Therefore, the paths of an antimatroid are exactly the feasible sets that do not equal the unions of their proper feasible subsets.

In the formal language formalization of an antimatroid, the longest strings are called basic words. Each basic word forms a permutation of the whole alphabet.

Convex geometries

For instance, in a shelling antimatroid, the convex sets are intersections of the given point set with convex subsets of Euclidean space. The set system defining a convex geometry must be closed under intersections.

To be a closure operator,  should have the following properties:
 : the closure of the empty set is empty.
The family of closed sets resulting from a closure operation of this type is necessarily closed under intersections, but might not be a convex geometry. The closure operators that define convex geometries also satisfy an additional anti-exchange axiom:
A closure operation satisfying this axiom is called an anti-exchange closure. If  is a minimal element of this partial order, then  is closed. That is, the family of closed sets of an anti-exchange closure has the property that for any set other than the universal set there is an element  that can be added to it to produce another closed set. This property is complementary to the accessibility property of antimatroids, and the fact that intersections of closed sets are closed is complementary to the property that unions of feasible sets in an antimatroid are feasible. Therefore, the complements of the closed sets of any anti-exchange closure form an antimatroid.

The undirected graphs in which the convex sets (subsets of vertices that contain all shortest paths between vertices in the subset) form a convex geometry are exactly the Ptolemaic graphs.

Join-distributive lattices
Every two feasible sets of an antimatroid have a unique least upper bound (their union) and a unique greatest lower bound (the union of the sets in the antimatroid that are contained in both of them). Therefore, the feasible sets of an antimatroid, partially ordered by set inclusion, form a lattice. Various important features of an antimatroid can be interpreted in lattice-theoretic terms; for instance the paths of an antimatroid are the join-irreducible elements of the corresponding lattice, and the basic words of the antimatroid correspond to maximal chains in the lattice. The lattices that arise from antimatroids in this way generalize the finite distributive lattices, and can be characterized in several different ways.

The description originally considered by  concerns meet-irreducible elements of the lattice. For each element  of an antimatroid, there exists a unique maximal feasible set  that does not contain :  can be constructed as the union of all feasible sets not containing . This set  is automatically meet-irreducible, meaning that it is not the meet of any two larger lattice elements. This is true because every feasible superset of  contains , and the same is therefore also true of every intersection of feasible supersets. That is, the lattice has unique meet-irreducible decompositions.
An interval is atomistic if every element in it is the join of atoms (the minimal elements above the bottom element ), and it is Boolean if it is isomorphic to the lattice of all subsets of a finite set. For an antimatroid, every interval that is atomistic is also boolean.
A semimodular and meet-semidistributive lattice is called a join-distributive lattice.

These three characterizations are equivalent: any lattice with unique meet-irreducible decompositions has boolean atomistic intervals and is join-distributive, any lattice with boolean atomistic intervals has unique meet-irreducible decompositions and is join-distributive, and any join-distributive lattice has unique meet-irreducible decompositions and boolean atomistic intervals. Thus, we may refer to a lattice with any of these three properties as join-distributive. Any antimatroid gives rise to a finite join-distributive lattice, and any finite join-distributive lattice comes from an antimatroid in this way. Another equivalent characterization of finite join-distributive lattices is that they are graded (any two maximal chains have the same length), and the length of a maximal chain equals the number of meet-irreducible elements of the lattice.

This representation of any finite join-distributive lattice as an accessible family of sets closed under unions (that is, as an antimatroid) may be viewed as an analogue of Birkhoff's representation theorem under which any finite distributive lattice has a representation as a family of sets closed under unions and intersections.

Supersolvable antimatroids
Motivated by a problem of defining partial orders on the elements of a Coxeter group,  studied antimatroids which are also supersolvable lattices. A supersolvable antimatroid is defined by a totally ordered collection of elements, and a family of sets of these elements. The family must include the empty set. As Armstrong observes, any family of sets of this type forms an antimatroid. Armstrong also provides a lattice-theoretic characterization of the antimatroids that this construction can form.

Join operation and convex dimension

This is a different operation than the join considered in the lattice-theoretic characterizations of antimatroids: it combines two antimatroids to form another antimatroid, rather than combining two sets in an antimatroid to form another set.
The family of all antimatroids over the same universe forms a semilattice with this join operation.

Joins are closely related to a closure operation that maps formal languages to antimatroids, where the closure of a language  is the intersection of all antimatroids containing  as a sublanguage. Every antimatroid can be represented as a join of a family of chain antimatroids, or equivalently as the closure of a set of basic words; the convex dimension of an antimatroid  is the minimum number of chain antimatroids (or equivalently the minimum number of basic words) in such a representation.

Therefore, the order dimension of the inclusion ordering of the feasible sets is at most equal to the convex dimension of the antimatroid. However, in general these two dimensions may be very different: there exist antimatroids with order dimension three but with arbitrarily large convex dimension.

Enumeration
The number of possible antimatroids on a set of elements grows rapidly with the number of elements in the set. For sets of one, two, three, etc. elements, the number of distinct antimatroids is

Applications
Both the precedence and release time constraints in the standard notation for theoretic scheduling problems may be modeled by antimatroids.  use antimatroids to generalize a greedy algorithm of Eugene Lawler for optimally solving single-processor scheduling problems with precedence constraints in which the goal is to minimize the maximum penalty incurred by the late scheduling of a task.

 use antimatroids to model the ordering of events in discrete event simulation systems.

 uses antimatroids to model progress towards a goal in artificial intelligence planning problems.

In Optimality Theory, a mathematical model for the development of natural language based on optimization under constraints, grammars are logically equivalent to antimatroids.

In mathematical psychology, antimatroids have been used to describe feasible states of knowledge of a human learner. Each element of the antimatroid represents a concept that is to be understood by the learner, or a class of problems that he or she might be able to solve correctly, and the sets of elements that form the antimatroid represent possible sets of concepts that could be understood by a single person. The axioms defining an antimatroid may be phrased informally as stating that learning one concept can never prevent the learner from learning another concept, and that any feasible state of knowledge can be reached by learning a single concept at a time. The task of a knowledge assessment system is to infer the set of concepts known by a given learner by analyzing his or her responses to a small and well-chosen set of problems. In this context antimatroids have also been called "learning spaces" and "well-graded knowledge spaces".

Notes

References

.
.

 
.

.
.
.
.
.
.
.
.
.
.

.
.
.
.

Algebraic combinatorics
Lattice theory
Convex geometry
Formal languages
Families of sets
Matroid theory
Discrete mathematics